Dénes Petz (1953–2018) was a Hungarian mathematical physicist and quantum information theorist. He is well known for his work on quantum entropy inequalities and equality conditions, quantum f-divergences, sufficiency in quantum statistical inference, quantum Fisher information, and the related concept of monotone metrics in quantum information geometry. He proposed the first quantum generalization of Rényi relative entropy and established its data processing inequality.

He has written or coauthored several textbooks which have been widely read by experts in quantum information theory.

He has also coauthored a book in the area of mathematical physics.

Personal life
He was born in Budapest, Hungary, on April 8, 1953.

Education
He received the M.Sc. degree in mathematics from the Eötvös Loránd University, Budapest, Hungary, in 1977 and the Ph.D. degree in mathematics from the Eötvös Loránd University, Budapest, Hungary, in 1979.
In 1982, he received the qualification "Candidate of the Mathematical Sciences" from the Hungarian Academy of Sciences with the thesis "Reduction Theory of Operator Algebras," and in 1989, he received the qualification "Doctor of the Mathematical Sciences" from the Hungarian Academy of Sciences with the thesis "Stochastical Aspects of Operator Algebras."

Career
From 1982-1989, he was a researcher at the Alfréd Rényi Institute of Mathematics of the Hungarian Academy of Science of the Hungarian Academy of Sciences. From 1990-1995, he was the head of Section for Functional Analysis at the Alfréd Rényi Institute of Mathematics of the Hungarian Academy of Sciences. From 1992 until his death, he was full professor of mathematics at the Budapest University of Technology and Economics. From 1996-1999 and 2002-2006, he was chair of the Department for Mathematical Analysis at the Budapest University of Technology and Economics. From 1996-2004, he was vice director of the Mathematical Institute of the Budapest University of Technology and Economics. From 1998-2002, he was vice dean of the Faculty of Natural Sciences of the Budapest University of Technology and Economics. From 2004 until his death, he was research professor at the Alfréd Rényi Institute of Mathematics of the Hungarian Academy of Sciences. From 2008 until his death, he was professor of mathematics at the Eötvös Loránd University.

From 1992 until his death, he was an Editor of the journal Open Systems & Information Dynamics.

Honors
 2013: Officer's Cross of the Order of Merit of the Republic of Hungary
 2009: Albert Szent-Györgyi Prize of the Ministry of Education
 2008: Research Prize of the Hungarian Academy of Sciences
 1997-2001: Széchenyi Professorship
 1998: Farkas Bolyai Prize of the Hungarian Academy of Sciences
 1997: Canon Fellow at the Tokyo University of Science (Japan)
 1988: Prize for Young Scientists awarded by the Hungarian Academy of Sciences
 1985-86: Alexander von Humboldt Fellowship
 1982: Géza Grünwald Memorial Prize awarded by the János Bolyai Mathematical Society of Hungary

See also
 quantum entropy
 quantum information theory
 quantum information geometry
 Rényi relative entropy
 quantum Fisher information

References

External links
 In Memory of Professor Dénes Petz
 Personal website of Dénes Petz
 Google Scholar page of Dénes Petz
 Seminar on Denes Petz's legacy in quantum information theory
 The Mathematics Genealogy Project

Eötvös Loránd University alumni
Academic staff of the Budapest University of Technology and Economics
1953 births
2018 deaths
Scientists from Budapest